Kate or Katie Allen may refer to:

Kate Allen (Amnesty International) (born 1955), director of Amnesty International UK
Kate Allen (triathlete) (born 1970), Australian triathlete
Kate Slatter (born 1971), Australian rower whose married name is Kate Allen
Katie Allen (field hockey) (born 1974), Australian Olympic field hockey player
Katie Allen (politician) (born 1966), Australian politician

See also
Allen (surname)